Vexillum (Pusia) salisburyi is a species of small sea snail, marine gastropod mollusk in the family Costellariidae, the ribbed miters.

Description
The shell size varies between 8 mm and 12 mm

Distribution
This species is distributed in the Indian Ocean along Réunion and the Mascarene Basin; and in the Western Pacific Ocean.

References

 Drivas, J. & M. Jay (1988). Coquillages de La Réunion et de l'île Maurice
 Turner H. 2001. Katalog der Familie Costellariidae Macdonald, 1860. Conchbooks. 1–100-page(s): 57

salisburyi
Gastropods described in 1976